Odostomia proxima is a species of sea snail, a marine gastropod mollusc in the family Pyramidellidae, the pyrams and their allies.

Description
The crystalline shell has an ovate, conic, shape. Its length measures 2.5 mm. The 1½ whorls of the protoconch are obliquely immersed in the first of the succeeding turns. The four whorls of the teleoconch are strongly constricted at the sutures, and moderately shouldered at the summit. They are marked by strong vertical axial ribs, of which 20 occur upon the second and third and 22 upon the penultimate turn. These ribs disappear at the periphery. The spaces between the ribs are marked by spiral cords a little less strong than the ribs; four of these occur between the sutures on the second and third, and seven upon the penultimate turn. Their intersections with the ribs form nodules. The sutures are channeled. The base of the shell is somewhat  attenuated. It is marked by eleven spiral cords, the spaces between which are axially lirate. The aperture is almost pear-shaped. The posterior angle is obtuse. The outer lip is thin, showing the external sculpture within. The columella is slender, somewhat curved and reflected, and provided with a strong fold at its insertion. The parietal wall is covered with a thin callus.

Distribution
This species occurs in the Pacific Ocean off Margarita Island, Bay of Panama.

References

External links
 To World Register of Marine Species

proxima
Gastropods described in 1872